Ad. Manufahi or Associação Desportiva Manufahi is a football club of East Timor come from Manufahi. The team plays in the Taça Digicel.

External links
 Ad. Manufahi at National-Football-Teams.com

Football clubs in East Timor
Football
Association football clubs established in 2010
2010 establishments in East Timor
Manufahi Municipality